Uganda competed at the 2012 Summer Paralympics in London, United Kingdom from August 29 to September 9, 2012.

Athletics 
David Emong fourth-place finish in the men's 1500m T46 at these Games was the closest the country every came to winning at medal at the Paralympic Games.
Men's Track and Road Events

Women's Track and Road Events

See also

 Uganda at the 2012 Summer Olympics

References

Nations at the 2012 Summer Paralympics
2012
2012 in Ugandan sport